Adjaratou Abdoulaye is a Togolese politician and a member of the Pan-African Parliament from Togo. She was elected to the National Assembly of Togo in the 2007 parliamentary election, representing the Rally of the Togolese People. She was elected to the Pan-African Parliament for the period 2009-2014

References

Living people
Members of the Pan-African Parliament from Togo
Rally of the Togolese People politicians
Members of the National Assembly (Togo)
21st-century Togolese women politicians
21st-century Togolese politicians
Women members of the Pan-African Parliament
Year of birth missing (living people)